The Knox Cube Imitation Test (KCIT, or CIT, or KCT) was developed as a nonverbal intelligence test developed by Dr. Howard Andrew Knox, a medical officer at Ellis Island. It was first published as a pamphlet in 1913, and then in 1914 as a paper in the Journal of the American Medical Association.

Knox wrote:

There were several other tests presented in his paper besides the cube test. In the cube test, 4 black 1" cubes were placed in a row, each cube separated by 4 inches from its neighbors. The test administrators takes a smaller cube and taps on the 4 1" cubes in increasingly complicated sequences. The test subject is requested, sometimes only by sign language, to repeat the sequence. If the cubes are numbered 1 through 4, the sequences in order are:
a. 1,2,3,4 
b. 1,2,3,4,3
c. 1,2,3,4,2
d. 1,3,2,4,3
e. 1,3,4,2,1
and so on. 

Knox suggested that sequence a (1-2-3-4) is reasonable for a child of 4 years of age, sequence b (1-2-3-4-3) is suitable for a 5-year-old, sequence c (1-2-3-4-2) can be accomplished by a 6-year-old, sequence d (1-3-2-4) can be done by the average 8-year-old, and copying sequence e (1-3-4-2-3-1) is expected by most 11-year-olds. Some of these sequences were repeated as part of other published tests such as Arthur (1947) and Wright & Stone (1979).

Performance on the Knox Cube Imitation Test is correlated with both verbal IQ and performance IQ.

See also
Henry H. Goddard
Vineland Training School
Simon (game)
N-back

Notes

External links
Knox's "Cube Imitation" Test, from  Knox's "Cube Imitation" Test Knox, H.A. …, John Michael Linacre, Rasch Measurement Transactions, 1999, 13:3 p. 708

Intelligence tests
Cognitive tests